Jessica Bailiff is an American singer-songwriter from Toledo, Ohio. Her music is largely classified as slowcore, although it contains elements of post-rock and shoegaze. Bailiff was discovered by Low's Alan Sparhawk, who recommended her earlier demos to Kranky, the label on which Bailiff later recorded. Bailiff collaborated and released records with acts such as Odd Nosdam of Anticon. and cLOUDDEAD fame, Low's Alan Sparhawk, Dave Pearce of Flying Saucer Attack, Casino Versus Japan, Rivulets and Annelies Monseré amongst others. Bailiff was also featured on The Wire's Brain in the Wire compilation.

Discography
Even in Silence (1998, Kranky)
Hour of the Trace (1999, Kranky)
Jessica Bailiff (2002, Kranky)
Feels Like Home (2006, Kranky)
Old Things (2007, Morc Records)
At the Down-turned Jagged Rim of the Sky (2012, Kranky)

Collaborations
Clear Horizon (2003, Kranky) (Collaboration with Dave Pearce)
Eau Claire (2005, Kranky) (Collaboration with Rachel Staggs)
Northern Song Dynasty (2002, People The Sky/2005, All Is Number Records; Collaboration with Jesse Edwards)

Rivulets
DEBRIDEMENT (2003, Chair Kickers' Union)
you've got your own (2004, Acuarela Discos)
you are my home (2006, Important Records)

Compilation appearances
"Shadow" on Brain in the Wire
"Brother La (Twin Scorpio Mix)" on Brainwaves (2006)
"Chapter 4 " on Chamber Music by James Joyce / Fire Records (2008)
"Untitled Three- EP"  Jessica Bailiff & Odd Nosdam on Anticon 2005

References

External links
Jessica Bailiff
Biography at Kranky
Concert photos by Laurent Orseau
Jessica Bailiff interview (September 2002) in QRD
Jessica Bailiff interview (July 2006) in QRD
Jessica Bailiff guitar set-up (2006) in QRD

Living people
Year of birth missing (living people)
Musicians from Toledo, Ohio
American women singer-songwriters
Singer-songwriters from Ohio
21st-century American women